Sarab-e Shahrak-e Olya (also Romanized as Sarāb-e Shahrak-e ‘Olyā; also known as Charīkeh-ye Bālā, Sarāb-e Shahrak, Sarāb Shahrak, Shahrak-e Bālā, Shahrak-e ‘Olyā, Sharak-e Bālā, Sharīkeh Bāla, and Sharīkeh-ye Bālā) is a village in Yeylan-e Shomali Rural District, in the Central District of Dehgolan County, Kurdistan Province, Iran. At the 2006 census, its population was 307, in 65 families. The village is populated by Kurds.

References 

Towns and villages in Dehgolan County
Kurdish settlements in Kurdistan Province